Al-Khaldiya (also Al-Khalidiya, Khalidiya, Khalediya) is a city in Al-Anbar Province, in central Iraq, on the southern banks of river Euphrates. It was founded in 1969 as a settlement for Assyrian Christian families who were displaced as a result of the closure of RAF Habbaniya, though it is now predominantly populated by Sunni Arabs. North of Al-Khaldiya, on the northern banks of Euphrates river, the peninsula of Khalidiya Island is located.

Al-Khalidiya was captured by ISIL in 2014. Although the city was recaptured by Iraqi security forces, only four buildings remained after intense fighting.

References

1969 establishments in Iraq
Populated places in Al Anbar Governorate
Populated places on the Euphrates River